Championship Lode Runner is a sequel to the 1983  puzzle-platform game Lode Runner. It was released in 1984 for the Apple II, Commodore 64, and IBM PC (as a self-booting disk), then ported to the Atari 8-bit family, Famicom, SG-1000, and MSX. Mostly the same as Lode Runner, Championship Lode Runner has levels that are much more difficult. Unlike the original, it does not include a level editor.

Gameplay

The object of the game is to pick up all the gold pieces (which appear as piles of gold) and get them to the top. Using non-violent methods, enemies had to be overcome. Bumping into enemies cost the player a life and all of his hard-earned gold pieces. Fifty of the hardest levels ever designed are used and they had to be tackled in proper sequential order. While games can be saved, the player automatically loses a life for restoring his game.

Unlike the original Lode Runner game, this version does not come with a level editor. Many of the levels made for this game were designed using the built-in level editor from the original game.

Ports 
The game was first released for the Apple II. The Famicom port of the game was published by Hudson Soft. Famicom players can start at any of the first ten levels while needing passwords to skip to the next levels. The Apple II version and Famicom offered players a certificate for completing the game.

The IBM PC self-booting disk version was written by Doug Greene.

In 1985, Sega published the game for the SG-1000 in Japan and it was released on the My Card format. A port was also released for the MSX. Both versions were developed by Compile.

Reception
Based on sales and market-share data, Video magazine listed the game seventh on its list of best selling video games in February 1985.

References

External links
Info on Hudson Soft's website (Famicom version)

1984 video games
Apple II games
Atari 8-bit family games
Broderbund games
Commodore 64 games
Hudson Soft games
MSX games
Nintendo Entertainment System games
Puzzle-platform games
Video game sequels
Video games developed in the United States
Virtual Console games
Virtual Console games for Wii U
SG-1000 games